William Culbertson may refer to:

William Culbertson (businessman), U.S. businessman from Indiana
William Constantine Culbertson (1825–1906), U.S. Representative from Pennsylvania
William Wirt Culbertson (1835–1911), U.S. Representative from Kentucky
William Smith Culbertson (1884–1966), U.S. Ambassador to Romania and Chile
William Culbertson III (1905–1971), fifth President of the Moody Bible Institute in Chicago

See also
William Louis Culberson, lichenologist